Lindsay Allan Maine (6 January 1887 – 23 September 1969) was an Australian rules footballer who played with South Melbourne in the Victorian Football League (VFL).

Family
The son of Allan McNab Maine, and Catherine Maine, née McLennan, Lindsay Allan Maine was born at Elphinstone, Victoria on 6 January 1887.

He married Minnie Josephine Nunan (1889-1969) in 1919.

Football

South Melbourne (VFL) 
He played 16 senior games for South Melbourne, over two seasons (1907-1908).

Essendon A (VFA) 
In June 1908 he was granted a clearance from South Melbourne to Essendon Association Football Club in the VFA.

He played 72 senior games for Essendon A over five seasons (1908-1912), and played three matches for a combined VFA team in 1911.

Death
He died at Caulfield, Victoria on 23 September 1969.

Notes

References
 
 The South Melbourne Team, The Leader, (Saturday, 16 May 1908), p.25.

External links 

 Lindsay Maine, at The VFA Project.

1887 births
1969 deaths
Australian rules footballers from Victoria (Australia)
Sydney Swans players